My Universe is the second studio album by British country music duo the Shires, released on 30 September 2016 through Decca Records. The album entered the UK Albums Chart at number three, with sales of 14,913 units which made it the fastest-selling UK country album of all time. The album was recorded in Nashville.

My Universe was accompanied by a tour of the same name.

Track listing 
All tracks produced by Tim Larsson and Tobias Lundgren. Additional production on "Beats to Your Rhythm" by Dan McDougall.

Charts and certifications

Charts

Certifications

References

2016 albums
The Shires (duo) albums
Decca Records albums